Lavy is a rural locality (a village) in Vysokovskoye Rural Settlement, Ust-Kubinsky District, Vologda Oblast, Russia. The population was 1 as of 2002.

Geography 
Lavy is located 14 km southeast of Ustye (the district's administrative centre) by road. Mitenskoye is the nearest rural locality.

References 

Rural localities in Tarnogsky District